Patiizbyansky is a rural locality (a khutor) and the administrative center of Pyatiizbyanskoye Rural Settlement, Kalachyovsky District, Volgograd Oblast, Russia. The population was 730 as of 2010. There are 5 streets.

Geography 
Patiizbyansky is located 27 km southwest of Kalach-na-Donu (the district's administrative centre) by road. Morskoy is the nearest rural locality.

References 

Rural localities in Kalachyovsky District
Don Host Oblast